The Chemistry of Death is a German/British television series based on the same named novel by crime fiction writer Simon Beckett. The series stars Harry Treadaway, Samuel Anderson, Jefferson Hall and Jeanne Goursaud. It premiered on January 12, 2023 in Germany and on January 19, 2023 in the United Kingdom.

Plot 
Based on the best-selling novel The Chemistry of Death, the series tells the story of Dr. David Hunter, who is forced by a tragic stroke of fate to give up his profession. He has set up a new life in a small village called Manham. There he works as a partner to the village doctor, Dr. Maitland. When the local police ask him to help solve a murder case, the ghosts of his past plague him. Now Hunter has to decide whether to turn away or return to his old life, which he actually wanted to leave behind forever. Even as the demons of his past haunt him, Hunter decides to return to work for the police and is drawn into cases that brings him to his limits.

Cast and characters 

 Harry Treadaway as David Hunter
 Samuel Anderson as DCI Mackanzie
 Jefferson Hall as Ben Anders
 Jeanne Goursaud as Jenny Krause
 Lucian Msamati as Dr. Henri Maitland
 Neve McIntosh as DS Josie Fraser
 Stuart Campbell as PC Duncan McKinney
 Katie Leung as Maggie Cassidy
 Stuart Bowman as Iain Kinross
 David Haymann as Brody
 Amy Manson as Ellen McLeod
 Nick Blood as Michael Strachan
 Amy Nuttall as Grace Strachan
 Hardy Krüger Jr. as Gunther

Release 
Announced was the series first time in June 2022, when Paramount+ got announced in Germany with their own originals. In January 2023 the series began airing on Paramount+, with one episode a week.

Episodes

Season 1 (2023)

References

External links 
 

British thriller television series
Paramount+ original programming
2023 British television series debuts
Television shows based on British novels
English-language television shows